SLNS Sayura (Sayura, in Sinhalese: Sea) is the former flagship and an offshore patrol vessel (OPV) of the Sri Lanka Navy.

She was upgraded with new armament in India before being delivered to the Sri Lanka Navy. India also committed to providing maintenance and refit of the ship.

Operations
Sayura was tasked with deep sea patrolling both within the Sri Lankan territorial waters and in international waters to curb arms smuggling by the LTTE. During the 4th Ealam war after undergoing a major refit in India, Sayura, along with other OPVs of the Sri Lanka Navy, has successfully intercepted several ships smuggling arms for the LTTE. In all these cases the ships were sunk when the LTTE Sea Tigers attacked the naval vessels with mortars. Sayura also participated in the Cadex 2009 military training exercises with the Indian Navy after the war ended.

In 2017, it sailed to Langkawi to take part in LIMA 2017 with a detachment of the newly formed Marine battalion.

Commanding officers
The first Sri Lankan Navy officer to Captain the ship was then Captain SMAJ Perera USP, psc.

Since then it has been commanded by:

Captain (Later CMDE while commanding) AARA Dias RSP, USP, psc, MSc(DS)

Captain AR Amarasinghe RSP, USP, psc

Captain RC Wijegunaratne WV, RWP, RSP, psn

Captain DMS Dissanayake RWP, psc

Captain (Later CMDE while commanding) KKVPH De Silva WWV, USP

CMDE SWC Mohotty MSc (DS) Mgmt)

CMDE NAN Sarathsena RSP, MSc (DS) Mgmt.

CMDE WASS Perera RWP, RSP, USP, psc

INS Sarayu
Commissioned 10 April 1991, INS Sarayu (P54) served with the Indian Navy until she was sold to Sri Lanka on 1 November 2000.

References

External links
Sri Lanka Navy
Defenders of the ocean receive heroes’ welcome on their triumphant return to home base

Ships of the Sri Lanka Navy
Naval ships of Sri Lanka
1989 ships
Ships built in India